The Gambia Civil Aviation Authority (GCAA) is the civil aviation authority of The Gambia. The agency head office is located at Banjul International Airport in Banjul.

It is an autonomous government body. It was established under the Public Enterprise Act of 1989 in July 1991 as an autonomous government body.

References

External links

 Gambia Civil Aviation Authority

Gambia
Civil aviation in the Gambia
Government of the Gambia
Transport organisations based in the Gambia
Aviation organisations based in the Gambia